The flag of Chattanooga was adopted 29 August 2012 and is the official flag of the U.S. city of Chattanooga, Tennessee.

History

Former flag
The former flag used from 1923 to 2012 had a blue circle with one white five-pointed star with two dogwood leaves on a rectangular field of red, with a strip of white and blue on the fly.

Current flag
The current flag, adopted 29 August 2012, is a green-blue-green horizontal triband with a modified version of the city's seal in center. The green stripes represent mountains while the blue stripe represents the Tennessee River. The seal was adopted in February 1975, and was designed by George Little.

References

Further reading
 City of Chattanooga Resolution for flag adoption (PDF)

External links
 Flags of the World's entry on the Chattanooga flag

Flag
Flags of cities in Tennessee
2012 establishments in Tennessee
Flags introduced in 2012